Ytterbium chloride may refer to either of these ytterbium compounds:

Ytterbium(II) chloride, YbCl2
Ytterbium(III) chloride, YbCl3